Christopher Holtz Pike (born January 13, 1964) is a former American football defensive tackle who played for three seasons in the National Football League (NFL). He played college football for North Carolina and Tulsa. He was drafted by the Philadelphia Eagles in the sixth round (158th overall) of the 1987 NFL Draft. He was traded to the Cleveland Browns on March 25, 1988, in exchange for defensive back D.D. Hoggard and a 1988 sixth-round pick (which was later used to select defensive back Rob Sterling). He played for the Browns in 1989 and 1990, appearing in 24 games with 11 starts in 1990. Pike signed with the San Diego Chargers in 1991 as a Plan B free agent, but did not report to the team and was released on April 25, 1991. He signed with the Los Angeles Rams on September 12, 1991, and played in eight games with four starts for the team in 1991.

References

1964 births
Living people
American football defensive tackles
Players of American football from Washington, D.C.
North Carolina Tar Heels football players
Tulsa Golden Hurricane football players
Philadelphia Eagles players
Cleveland Browns players
San Diego Chargers players
Los Angeles Rams players